Monica Manalansan (born 29 June 1993) is a Filipino footballer.
She competed in the 2016 AFF Women's Championship, winning the gold medal.

She played for UP Fighting Maroons, and Hiraya F.C.

References 

1993 births
Living people
Philippines women's international footballers
Filipino women's footballers
Women's association footballers not categorized by position